Arthur Bell may refer to:
 Arthur Bell (martyr) (1590–1643), Franciscan and English martyr
 Arthur Bell (distiller), (1825–1900) founded Bell's whisky brand
 Arthur Bell (cricketer) (1869–1946), New Zealand cricketer
 Arthur Bell (engineer) (1856–1943), New Zealand engineer
 Arthur Bell (footballer) (1882–1923), English footballer
 Arthur Hornbui Bell (1891–1973), Grand Dragon of the Ku Klux Klan in New Jersey
 Arthur Bell (rower) (1899–1963), Canadian Olympic rower
 Arthur Bell (journalist) (1939–1984),  American journalist, author and LGBT rights activist
 Art Bell (1945–2018), American broadcaster and author
 Arthur Kinmond Bell (1868–1942), Scottish distiller and philanthropist
 Professor Ernest Arthur Bell  (1926–2006), Director of the Royal Botanic Gardens, Kew from 1981 to 1988

Places
Bell Arthur, North Carolina, United States